Hans-Ulrich Klose (29 March 1935 – 7 February 2022) was a German politician. A member of the Christian Democratic Union of Germany, he served in the Landtag of North Rhine-Westphalia from 1985 to 2005. He died in Korschenbroich on 7 February 2022, at the age of 86.

References

1935 births
2022 deaths
20th-century German politicians
21st-century German politicians
Christian Democratic Union of Germany politicians
Members of the Landtag of North Rhine-Westphalia
People from Märkisch-Oderland